Monilaria obconica is a species from family Aizoaceae first described by H.D. Ihlenfeldt and S. Jorgensen. Monilaria obconica is part of the genus Monilaria. no subspecies are listed in the Catalogue of Life. This species is endemic to Namaqualand region.

The resemblance of Monilaria obconica's leaves to bunny ears and its other features facilitated a surge in popularity on Twitter throughout Japan in 2017.

References

Aizoaceae